Michael Korrel (born 27 February 1994) is a Dutch judoka.

He won the bronze medal at the 2019 World Judo Championships in the –100 kg category.

He won the silver medal in his event at the 2022 Judo Grand Slam Tel Aviv held in Tel Aviv, Israel.

References

External links
 
 
 

1994 births
Living people
Dutch male judoka
People from Vianen
European Games competitors for the Netherlands
Judoka at the 2015 European Games
Judoka at the 2019 European Games
Judoka at the 2020 Summer Olympics
Olympic judoka of the Netherlands
20th-century Dutch people
21st-century Dutch people
Sportspeople from Utrecht (province)